AdventHealth Redmond , (formerly Redmond Park Hospital and Redmond Regional Medical Center), is located in Rome, Georgia, United States, and is one of the largest employers in Floyd County with a staff of 1,200 and over 250 affiliated doctors.  Redmond is a 230-bed medical, surgical and rehab unit serving Rome, Floyd County, and surrounding counties.

Serving as the heart hospital for northwest Georgia, Redmond offers cardiac services and is the only dedicated chest pain center in Northwest Georgia.  Other areas include emergency care, orthopaedics, vascular care, the surgery center, and an inpatient rehabilitation unit.  The hospital does coronary artery bypass surgery,  heart attack care, knee surgery, total and partial hip joint replacement, and hip fracture surgery.

Improvements include a new ICU wing, a new 34 bed medical/surgical unit made up of exclusively private rooms and an extended parking lot.  Emergency Department and patient room renovations are underway.

References

External links

Hospital buildings completed in 1972
Hospitals in Georgia (U.S. state)
Buildings and structures in Rome, Georgia